{{Infraspeciesbox
|name = 
|image = 
|image_caption = 
|genus = Correa
|species = lawrenceana
|varietas = macrocalyx
|authority = Paul G.Wilson<ref name="APC">

Correa lawrenceana var. macrocalyx is a variety of Correa lawrenceana and is endemic to New South Wales. It is a shrub with leathery, egg-shaped to broadly egg-shaped leaves, and cylindrical, greenish yellow flowers arranged in leaf axils or on the ends of short branchlets.

Description
Flowering mostly occurs in spring.

Taxonomy
The variety was first formally described in 1929 by William Blakely in Proceedings of the Linnean Society of New South Wales from specimens he collected with David Shiress at Patonga in 1923. In 1961, Paul Wilson reduced it to a variety of C. lawrenceana.

Distribution and habitat
This variety of C. lawrenceana has usually been recorded as growing on the edge of rainforest in mountainous places between the Taree-Kendall and the Illawarra regions of New South Wales.

References

lawrenciana macrocalyx
Flora of New South Wales
Taxa named by William Blakely
Plants described in 1929